Catherine Hakim (born 30 May 1948) is a British sociologist who specialises in women's employment and women's issues. She is known for developing the preference theory, for her work on erotic capital and more recently for a sex-deficit theory. She is currently a Professorial Research Fellow at the Institute for the Study of Civil Society (Civitas), and has formerly worked in British central government and been a senior research fellow at the London School of Economics and the Centre for Policy Studies. She has also been a visiting professor at the Social Science Research Center Berlin.

Background
Born in Beirut, Hakim  grew up in the Middle East and moved to the United Kingdom for boarding school at age 16, around 1964. She earned a B.A. at the University of Sussex in 1969 and a Ph.D. in sociology at the University of Essex in 1974. She worked in Caracas, Venezuela 1969–1972 and as a research officer with the Tavistock Institute in London 1972–1974. She was a senior research officer with the British Office of Population Censuses and Surveys (now the Office of National Statistics) 1974–1978, and a principal research officer with the Department of Employment 1978–1989. She was professor of sociology at the University of Essex and director of the ESRC Data Archive 1989–1990. She was affiliated with the London School of Economics between 1993 and 2011; she became a Morris Ginsberg fellow in 1993 and was employed as a senior research fellow in the sociology department until 2003. From 2003 to 2011 she was affiliated with the LSE in a visiting capacity; she maintained an office at the institution and was listed as a senior research fellow in the sociology department at the LSE website until 2011, when the arrangement came to an end amid public discussion of her book Honey Money. Since 2011 she has been a Professorial Research Fellow at the Centre for Policy Studies and the Institute for the Study of Civil Society (Civitas), and a visiting professor at the Social Science Research Center Berlin.

Career and work
Hakim has published extensively on labour market topics, women's employment, sex discrimination, social and family policy, as well as social statistics and research design. She has published over 100 articles in academic journals and edited collections, and over a dozen textbooks and research monographs. She is best known for developing preference theory and her criticism of many feminist assumptions about women's employment. Her most recent books develop a theory of "erotic capital" and its power in all social interaction, in the workplace, politics and in public life generally as well as in the invisible negotiations of private relationships.

Hakim was a member of the editorial board of the European Sociological Review and a former member of the editorial board of International Sociology.

The idea of erotic capital

Catherine Hakim's perspective 

Catherine Hakim states that erotic capital is an asset in many social and economic settings such as media and politics. This theory added erotic as an additional form of capital to Pierre Bourdieu's concept of society being run by four main types of capital - cultural, social, symbolic, and economic. Hakim defined erotic capital as the concept that an individual's beauty, sexual attractiveness, enhanced social interaction, liveliness, social presentation, sexuality, and fertility can provide opportunities to advance in life. According to Hakim, the most important and most controversial of these seven components would be sexual attractiveness, as her studies indicated that family men tend to crave sex more than women, a phenomenon she named the male sex deficit. She encouraged young women to use this asset to earn a more respectable position in society. Hakim believes that erotic capital has gone unacknowledged for far too long and that the patriarchal society and moral constraints of conservative communities have caused the idea of beauty and attractiveness to stress the importance of personality, not giving enough credit to physique. She doesn't encourage a society based on solely erotic capital but rather states that it plays a subconscious role in daily life decisions, such as career offerings, enrichment opportunities, and social networking. For example, she places current dating apps and social media on the spotlight, stating that the internet has created somewhat of a digitized version of dating and that these markets will gain traction as time goes on. She strongly believes that these sites and the decision of marriage are driven by a woman's erotic capital and a man's economic capital.

Contradictions 
Many groups such as feminists have actively rejected the idea of erotic capital by stating that the sex positive movement highlights the rights of women in only a manner that highlights advantages and ignores contradictory research that has shown that attractive women are less likely to receive a promotion. Bourdieu's followers have asserted that he had developed the idea of 'body capital' long ago but refused to include it in his general capital because it was too intertwined with economic capital. For example, if a woman from a high socioeconomic status could buy beauty products and afford body shaping surgeries, she would be able to change her body capital.

Sex deficit

In 2017, Hakim was accused of misogyny after publishing an article which critics claim suggested women are to blame for sexual assault. The article bases its argument on a research paper published in 2015 which evaluated 30 sex surveys globally and claimed that, since the 1960s sexual revolution, women's sexual motivation and interest in the developed world has decreased, causing what Hakim calls a "male sexual deficit". This, it is argued, can help explain why sexual harassment, sexual violence, rape, rising demand for commercial sexual services and other behaviours are almost exclusively male. She has argued that the sex deficit also derives from men naturally having a higher sex drive than women.

Publications

Selected books

Secondary analysis in social research, London : Allen & Unwin, 1982, 
Social Change and Innovation in the Labour Market: Evidence from the Census SARs on Occupational Segregation and Labour Mobility, Part-Time Work and Student Jobs, Homework and Self-Employment (Oxford University Press, 1998). 
Work-Lifestyle Choices in the 21st Century: Preference Theory (Oxford University Press, 2000). With a Preface by Anthony Giddens. 
Research Design: Successful Designs for Social and Economic Research (Routledge, 2000). 
Models of the Family in Modern Societies: Ideals and Realities (Ashgate, 2003). 
Key Issues in Women's Work (Glasshouse Press, 1996, 2004). 
Modelos de Familia en las Sociedades Modernas: Ideales y Realidades (Centro de Investigaciones Sociológicas, 2005). 
Little Britons: Financing Childcare Choice (Policy Exchange, 2008), with Karen Bradley, Emily Price and Louisa Mitchell.

Selected articles

 
 
  Pdf.

References

External links
Official website

1948 births
Living people
British sociologists
Academics of the London School of Economics
British women sociologists